Pett and Pott (subtitled A Fairy Story of the Suburbs) is a 1934 short film produced by John Grierson under the auspices of the GPO Film Unit and directed by Alberto Cavalcanti.

Synopsis
Made to promote wider use of the telephone,  Pett and Pott is a satirical comedy. based around two contrasting suburban families who live next door to each other. While virtuous Mrs Pett looks after the home and tends to her children, decadent Mrs Pott prefers to idle in her chair reading a saucy book.

Cavalcanti had established a name for himself making avant-garde films in the 1930s. and managed to smuggle a number of sound and visual experiments into a rather light storyline. The first 'experimental' sequence occurs when we see Mr Pett (a solicitor) and Mr Pott (a debt collector) on the train with other businessmen dressed in identical suits and bowler hats. A close-up of a newspaper headline 'Another Suburban Burglary', is followed by a cut to a woman awaking in her bed screaming – her scream merging with the noise of a train going through a tunnel.

Back in suburbia, Mrs Pett is seen using the house's telephone for transactions and personal calls. Mrs Pott prefers to invest her money in a maid and in another experimental sequence Mrs Pott is seen becoming a slave to her own maid. As she trudges up steps with heavy shopping, the calendar flicks through the days, while the same image is shown over a monotonous drum beat. The maid invites a friend round and the two of them begin to steal from the Potts' household. The noises they make alert the Petts' daughter, who uses the telephone to call the police. In court the Potts are condemned for their decadent behaviour, whilst the Petts - and the telephone - are praised.
Viewed in retrospect, the film has been described as 'radical fun', rather like Un Chien Andalou reworked by Gilbert and Sullivan.

Cast
 J. M. Reeves - Mr Petter
 Majorie Fone - Mrs Petter
 June Godfrey - Polly Pett
 Bruce Winston - The Judge
 Eric Hudson  - Mr Pott
 Barbara Nixon - Mrs Pott
 Jack Scott - The Burglar
 Alberto Calvalcanti – J. Leviticus
 Humphrey Jennings - Grocer
 Stuart Legg - Admiral
 Basil Wright - Vicar
 Valeska Gert

References

External links
 
 
 

British short films
1934 films
GPO Film Unit films
Films directed by Alberto Cavalcanti
British black-and-white films
1934 comedy films
British comedy films
Humphrey Jennings
1930s English-language films
1930s British films